Blue Blood and Red is a 1916 American silent western comedy film directed by Raoul Walsh and starring George Walsh, Martin Kinney, and Doris Pawn.

Premise
After being kicked out of Harvard and thrown out by his millionaire father, a young wastrel heads west in the company of his butler.

Cast
 George Walsh as Algernon DuPont 
 Martin Kinney as Peterkin 
 Doris Pawn
 James A. Marcus
 Jack Woods
 Augustus Carney
 Vester Pegg

References

Bibliography
 Solomon, Aubrey. The Fox Film Corporation, 1915-1935: A History and Filmography. McFarland, 2011.

External links
 

1916 films
1916 comedy films
American silent feature films
Films directed by Raoul Walsh
American black-and-white films
Fox Film films
1910s English-language films
1910s American films
Silent American comedy films